Martin Luther Smyser (April 3, 1851 – May 6, 1908) was an American lawyer and politician who served two non consecutive terms as a U.S. Representative from Ohio.

Biography 
Born on a farm in Plain Township, Wayne County, Ohio, Smyser attended the common schools and was graduated from Wittenberg College, Springfield, Ohio, in 1870.
He studied law at Wooster under Lyman R. Critchfield.
He was admitted to the bar in 1872 and practiced in Wooster.
In 1873 he entered into partnership with Addison S. McClure.

Smyser was elected prosecuting attorney of Wayne County in 1872 and served one term.
He served as delegate to the Republican National Conventions in 1884 and 1888.

Smyser was elected as a Republican to the Fifty-first Congress (March 4, 1889 – March 3, 1891).
He was an unsuccessful candidate for reelection in 1890 to the Fifty-second Congress.
He resumed the practice of law in Wooster.
He was appointed to the Ohio District Courts of Appeals, January 15, 1898, by Governor Bushnell.

Smyser was elected as a Republican to the Fifty-ninth Congress (March 4, 1905 – March 3, 1907).
He was an unsuccessful candidate for reelection in 1906 to the Sixtieth Congress.
He continued the practice of law in Wooster, Ohio, until his death in that city May 6, 1908.
He was interred in Wooster Cemetery.

References

External links 
 

1851 births
1908 deaths
County district attorneys in Ohio
Ohio lawyers
People from Wayne County, Ohio
Wittenberg University alumni
19th-century American politicians
People from Wooster, Ohio
Republican Party members of the United States House of Representatives from Ohio